The Type 74 105 mm self-propelled howitzer is only used by Japan. It shares a number of automotive components with the Type 73 Armored Personnel Carrier which was developed during the same time. Komatsu developed the chassis, while the howitzer and turret were designed by Japan Steel Works. The first prototypes were completed in 1969–1970. The howitzer was accepted for service in 1974.

It carries 30 rounds on board. It is amphibious when using the erectable flotation screen stowed around the periphery of the upper hull. It is equipped with an NBC filtration system.

Type 74 was attached to 117th Artillery Battalion in Hokkaido. In 1999, all Type 74s were retired and the battalion was disbanded.

Notes

References 
 Chant, Christopher. A Compendium of Armaments and Military Hardware. New York and London: Routledge & Kegan Paul, 1987 , p. 76

External links

 Type 75 on OnWar.com
 excerpt from Jane's Armour and Artillery 2008

Japan Ground Self-Defense Force
105 mm artillery
Tracked self-propelled howitzers
Self-propelled howitzers of Japan
Military vehicles introduced in the 1970s